Bernardo Parentino, also known as Bernardo Parenzano (Italian; Croatian: Bernard Porečan) (c. 1450 – c. 1500) was a painter of the Renaissance period born in the Republic of Venice, active mainly in Padua. To his detriment, he is still being confused and superimposed by another person with the same name, an Augustine monk who took the name Fra Lorenzo (c. 1437–1531) and who died in the Monastery of St. Michael in Vicenza.

Born in Parenzo, then a Venetian town in Istria and died in Vicenza. He was influenced, if not a pupil, of the painter Andrea Mantegna. He painted Scenes of the life of San Benedetto for the cloister of Santa Giustina at Padua, and a Nativity once at the Accademia Gallery in Venice. An Adoration of the Magi, more indebted to Giovanni Bellini is found at the Louvre Museum He painted a nightmarish Temptation of St Anthony Abbot found at the Doria Pamphilj Gallery. Also known as Bernardo da Parenzo or Parenzano.

A catalogue of attributed paintings was listed in 1908, noting he was often confused with contemporaries of the school of Ferrara.

References

|Getty Museum entry

1430s births
1531 deaths
People from Poreč
15th-century Italian painters
Italian male painters
Republic of Venice artists
16th-century Italian painters
Renaissance painters